Books on Tape or Books on tape could refer to:

Books on Tape (company), an audiobook publishing company founded in 1975
Books on Tape (artist), a one-man electronic and rock act from Los Angeles, California
Audiobooks, spoken-word recordings